Szabolcs Gergő Schön (born 27 September 2000) is a Hungarian professional footballer who plays as a winger for Fehérvár and the Hungary national team.

Club career
In April 2021, Schön signed with FC Dallas. He returned to Hungary on 26 August 2022, signing with Fehérvár.

International career
On 1 June 2021, Schön was included in the final 26-man squad to represent Hungary at the rescheduled UEFA Euro 2020 tournament. He took part in two of three group stage matches for Hungary at Euro 2020 where Hungary nearly pulled off the impossible in escaping the group of death with France, Germany, and Portugal.

He made his debut for Hungary national team on 8 June 2021 in a friendly against Ireland. He substituted Ádám Szalai in the 88th minute of a 0–0 draw.

Career statistics

References

2000 births
Living people
Hungarian footballers
Hungary youth international footballers
Hungary under-21 international footballers
Hungary international footballers
Association football forwards
Eerste Divisie players
Nemzeti Bajnokság I players
Jong Ajax players
MTK Budapest FC players
FC Dallas players
Fehérvár FC players
UEFA Euro 2020 players
Hungarian people of German descent
Hungarian expatriate footballers
Expatriate footballers in the Netherlands
Hungarian expatriate sportspeople in the Netherlands
Expatriate soccer players in the United States
Hungarian expatriate sportspeople in the United States
Major League Soccer players
Footballers from Budapest